The Battle of the Argenta Gap was an engagement which formed part of the Allied spring 1945 offensive during the Italian campaign in the final stages of the Second World War. It took place in northern Italy from 12 to 19 April 1945 between troops of British V Corps commanded by Lieutenant-General Charles Keightley and German units of LXXVI Panzer Corps commanded by Lieutenant General (General der Panzertruppe) Gerhard von Schwerin.

Background

The Allied invasion of Italy occurred during September 1943, for a number of key reasons not least important of which was that support for the war in Italy had been declining and it was thought that an invasion would hasten the efforts of the new government that had deposed Benito Mussolini, which was seeking peace. Furthermore, the weakening of Axis control of the Mediterranean supply routes eased the pressure on Allied forces operating in the Middle and Far East, as well as on the efforts to supply to Soviet Union.

Operation Husky – the invasion of Sicily in July 1943 – was successful, serving as a springboard for the invasion of the mainland. In September, the first Allied troops to land in Italy were of the British Eighth Army under the then General Bernard Montgomery, in Operation Baytown. Further landings on 9 September 1943 saw the main attack force landing, despite the Italian surrender to the Allied forces on the previous day. After securing the beachheads, the U.S. Fifth Army began its advance northwards.

By the winter of 1944–45 the Allied armies had penetrated the main defences of the Gothic Line but had failed to break out into the Po river valley. A new major offensive was planned for the spring of 1945, when improving weather would allow the Allies to take advantage of their superior airpower and armoured and motorized ground forces.

Order of battle
Formations and units involved in the battle:
 15th Army Group – Lieutenant General Mark Clark
 British Eighth Army – Lieutenant-General Richard McCreery
 British V Corps – Lieutenant-General Charles Keightley
 56th (London) Infantry Division – Major-General John Y. Whitfield
 24th Guards Brigade
 167th (London) Infantry Brigade
 169th (London) Infantry Brigade
 2nd Commando Brigade (under command)
 9th Armoured Brigade(under command)
 78th Infantry Division – Major-General Keith Arbuthnott
 11th Infantry Brigade
 36th Infantry Brigade
 38th (Irish) Infantry Brigade
 2nd Armoured Brigade (under command)
 German Army Group C – General (Generaloberst) Heinrich von Vietinghoff
 German Tenth Army – Lieutenant-General (General der Panzertruppe) Traugott Herr
 LXXVI Panzer Corps – Lieutenant-General (General der Panzertruppe) Gerhard von Schwerin
 162nd (Turkestan) Infantry Division – Major-General (Generalleutnant) Ralph von Heygendorff
 42nd Jäger Division – Major-General (Generalleutnant) Walter Jost
 362nd Infantry Division – Brigadier-General (Generalmajor) Alois Weber
 In Army reserve
 29th Panzergrenadier Division – Major-General (Generalleutnant) Fritz Polack

Prelude

As a preliminary to the main operation, a commando assault (Operation Roast) was launched across Lake Comacchio on 1 April to secure the right flank of the Eighth Army for the coming battle to seize "the Spit", the narrow isthmus between the eastern shore of Lake Comacchio and the Adriatic Sea. This would secure the eastern flank of the Eighth Army and also allow trials to be carried out in secret of the suitability of using newly arrived LVT tracked landing craft for subsequent larger operations in the muddy and difficult conditions of Lake Comacchio. The operation was successful, although the LVTs failed dismally, becoming hopelessly bogged down. It was in this raid that Corporal Thomas Peck Hunter of 43 Commando posthumously received the Victoria Cross for his actions. Two nights later further actions by the Special Boat Service (SBS) supported by Italian Partisans of the 28th Garibaldi Brigade captured islands in the middle of the lake. Danish national, Major Anders Lassen a patrol commander of the Special Boat Service (SBS) was killed in a subsequent fighting reconnaissance and was awarded a Victoria Cross posthumously.

The 56th Infantry Division also made a preliminary attack on 5/6 April to secure its starting line for the Argenta gap operation. By 8 April, after meeting stiff resistance, it had completed its task in clearing "the Wedge", an area from the southern tip of Lake Comacchio where it meets the Reno river to the Fossa di Navigazione.

The main Eighth Army offensive across the Senio river commenced on 9 April and by 12 April the assault units had advanced to consolidate across the Santerno river and allow 78th Infantry Division to pass through towards the Reno river and the Argenta gap.

The battle

On the night of 10/11 April, British V Corps launched Operation Impact Plain to widen and deepen its bridgehead in the Wedge: 40th (Royal Marine) Commando advanced along the raised causeway bordering the lake while, from 56th (London) Division, 169th (Queen's) Brigade advanced on the commando's left across the flooded margins of the lake with two battalions in LVTs. The 56th Division's 167th Brigade advanced from the Wedge along the Reno flood banks. The commando column met stiff resistance at the bridge north east of Menate and took heavy casualties but were able to take the objective with the assistance of air support. 42nd Jaeger Division seems to have been taken by surprise by their opponents' amphibious capacity and seemed somewhat unnerved by the LVTs emerging from the water so that by daylight on 12 April all three columns had made some  headway, linking up in the Menate-Longastrino area. 169th Brigade then pushed forward on the road towards Filo and 167th Brigade continued up the Reno, rolling up the German defences as far as the confluence with the Santerno river to link with the Italian Cremona Combat Group which had advanced from the south.

Reacting to the Allied attack, von Vietinghof ordered 29th Panzergrenadier Division south to reinforce the Argenta gap. Its 15th Panzergrenadier Regiment arrived to reinforce 42nd Jaeger Division on 12 April but the rest of the division had been north of the Po and, delayed by air damage and fuel shortages was not in position until 14 April.

Early on 13 April the 38th (Irish) Brigade, of 78th Battleaxe Division, attacked northward from Indian 8th Division's bridgehead across the Santerno river with the objective of seizing a bridgehead across the Reno at Bastia, in the mouth of the Argenta gap. Meanwhile, to their right, 56th Infantry Division launched the second phase of its operation, Impact Royal. A foothold was established on the Fossa Marina, a canal running roughly east to west from Argenta to the lake and a  short of their objective but then the newly arrived 15th Panzer Grenadier Regiment blocked further progress and an attempt to take the bridge across the Fossa on 14 April was beaten back.

In the morning of 14 April forward elements of 38th Brigade had crossed the bridge over the Reno at Bastia but had been forced back by an armoured counterattack. It was decided to confine immediate activity to mopping up south of the Reno and await the approach of 167th Brigade which, advancing on both banks of the Reno, would shortly threaten the flank of the defenders north of the river in Bastia and oblige them to retire. Rather than wait for the bridge at Bastia to be cleared, V Corps commander, Lieutenant-General Charles Keightley ordered 78th Division's 11th Infantry Brigade to use 56th Division's bridges over the Reno in order to get forward towards Argenta without delay.

On 15/16 April 56th Division renewed their attack on the Fossa Marina but failed again. On the west side of the Argenta gap 11th Brigade was able to get across the Fossa Marina east of Argenta. The 2nd Battalion, Lancashire Fusiliers were able to hold on to a small bridgehead under heavy fire and counterattack while engineers positioned ARK armoured mobile bridges to allow supporting tanks to cross the canal.

On 17 April 38th (Irish) Brigade arrived from newly cleared Bastia and passed through 11th Brigade's bridgehead, tasked with widening the bridgehead to provide space to allow an armoured breakout. By dark the brigade had advanced  against determined resistance, working around the rear of Argenta. Meanwhile, 11th Brigade advanced into the town to clear it with the support of Crocodile armoured flame-throwers. An armoured counterattack early on 18 April was forced back towards 38th (Irish) Brigade. Meanwhile, on the west outskirts of the town the bridges over the Reno had been attacked and captured by 2nd Commando Brigade which had been advancing up the line of the river from Bastia. Attempted counterattacks on the bridges were broken up by supporting artillery. Also on 17 April 56th Division's 169th (Queen's) Brigade was passed through 11th Brigade's bridgehead across the Fossa Marina in order to drive eastwards to clear the north bank of the canal and link with the Guards Brigade.

On 18 April 78th Division brought forward 36th Infantry Brigade from reserve to pass through 38th (Irish) Brigade and conduct a series of right hooks north of Argenta. Meanwhile, a mobile force under the command of 2nd Armoured Brigade Headquarters comprising one infantry battalion, a tank regiment, a regiment of armoured personnel carriers and supporting self-propelled guns and assault engineers (the "Kangaroo Army") was brought forward and, bypassing Consonaldo, secured a bridgehead over the Fossa Benvignante north of the town. Advanced elements then pushed forward and before dark overran the artillery gun lines of 42nd Jaeger Division.

The 78th Division's advance created flank pressure on the German units facing 56th Division so that at midday on 18 April 169th (Queen's) Brigade detected a lessening resistance in front of them. Pushing forward, the brigade advanced to the Fossa Benvignante and captured a bridge intact. To their right the 24th Guards Brigade were finally able to clear Chiesa del Bando and advance towards the Fossa Benvignante as well.

Aftermath
With 56th and 78th Division now clear of the northern end of the Argenta gap, British 6th Armoured Division, from Eighth Army reserve, was released through the left wing of the advancing 78th Division to swing left to race north west along the line of the river Reno to Bondeno and link up with the U.S. Fifth Army units advancing north from west of Bologna and to complete the encirclement of the German armies defending Bologna. Effective Allied bombing of the crossings of the Po and shortage of fuel left much of the German Army Group's strength and almost all its heavy equipment and armament stranded south of the river, so sealing its fate. On 29 April an instrument of surrender was signed by German emissaries at Allied Army HQ and hostilities formally ceased on 2 May.

War Cemetery
An Allied war cemetery is now located at Argenta.

Notable burials
 Arthur Banks GC
 Tom Hunter (VC)
 Anders Lassen VC, MC

Notes

Citations

References
 
 http://www.warlinks.com/pages/8thdeeds.html
 http://www.britishsoldier.com/argenta2.htm (Kindly providing the images)

Bibliography
 Dictionary of Battles

External links
 The Irish Brigade Contains accounts of the 38th (Irish) Brigade in the Battle Argenta Gap including The Official Histories of the 1st and 2nd Battalion of the London Irish Rifles and their role in the battle.

Argenta
Argenta
1945 in Italy
Argenta Gap
Argenta Gap
Battle honours of the Rifle Brigade
Battle honours of the King's Royal Rifle Corps
April 1945 events in Europe
Argenta